The Poinsettia Bowl was a post-season NCAA-sanctioned Football Bowl Subdivision college football bowl game played in San Diego, California, United States from 2005 to 2016. The game was originally played from 1952 to 1955 between military services teams; in 2005 it was re-created by the organizers of the Holiday Bowl. The new Poinsettia Bowls were played in late December each year at SDCCU Stadium in San Diego, California. The game's last sponsor was the San Diego County Credit Union, and it was named the San Diego County Credit Union Poinsettia Bowl.

History

Military games
The original incarnation of the Poinsettia Bowl was as an armed forces football championship game, pitting western and eastern military services champions against each other.  In the inaugural Poinsettia Bowl, the Bolling Air Force Base Generals defeated the San Diego Naval Training Center Bluejackets by a score of 35–14 on December 20, 1952. The game was held at Balboa Stadium in San Diego in a torrential downpour, before hundreds of reluctant sailors – including future College Football Hall of Fame coach Hayden Fry – who were ordered to sit in the stands so that they wouldn't appear empty in the nationally televised game.  Television came to terms with the NCAA the next year, making the 1952 Poinsettia Bowl the last nationally televised game between military teams, other than the annual Army–Navy Game.

In 1953, the Fort Ord Warriors, an Army team that featured quarterback Don Heinrich and running back Ollie Matson, defeated the Quantico Marines team led by Hayden Fry at quarterback. The Fort Sill Canoneers defeated Bolling Air Force Base in 1954, and the Fort Ord Warriors returned as champions in 1955, defeating Pensacola Naval Air Station in the fourth and final such Poinsettia Bowl. In November 1956, organizers announced the cancellation of that year's game, "because of deployment of the fleet," shortly after the Suez Crisis.

NCAA games
The bowl was resurrected in 2005, and featured a team from the Mountain West Conference each year it was played, originally against an at-large opponent. The inaugural game matched Navy Midshipmen against the Colorado State Rams; Navy won 51–30.  It had attendance of 36,842.

In the week leading up to the 2005 game, the Navy Midshipmen accepted an invitation to the 2008, 2009, or 2010 Poinsettia Bowls if Navy was bowl-eligible in those seasons. The fact that there are several naval bases in and around San Diego contributed to this decision by the independent Midshipmen. Navy later played in the 2008 EagleBank Bowl and the 2009 Texas Bowl, then returned for the 2010 Poinsettia Bowl.

The Poinsettia Bowl announced that if the Army Black Knights became bowl-eligible by the end of the 2006 regular season, they would receive an automatic berth in their bowl game; however, the Cadets wound up with a losing record, and thus were not eligible.

In July 2007, it was announced that (starting with the 2008 game) the Pac-10 would send its seventh-place team to the game, and its sixth-place team in 2009 and 2010 – replacing the at-large team.

The 2007 game matched the Utah Utes against the Navy Midshipmen; Utah won, 35–32.  Navy made the Poinsettia Bowl as a result of Navy's win over North Texas (74–62), a game that set a new NCAA record for most points scored in a college football game.  That year's attendance was 39,129.

It was announced, starting with the 2008 season, and continuing through 2009, if the Pac-10 does not have enough bowl-eligible teams to send one to the Poinsettia Bowl (a contractual obligation), the game's organizers reserved the right to select a WAC team to take the Pac-10 team's place.

The 2008 game matched the No. 11 TCU Horned Frogs of the Mountain West Conference against the No. 9 Boise State Broncos the Western Athletic Conference champion; TCU won, 17–16.  Boise State replaced the representative from the Pac-10, since it did not have any extra bowl-eligible teams to spare for this game.  The game garnered a 3.74 national television rating on ESPN, the bowl's most watched game ever and the highest rated pre-Christmas game ever on the all-sports network.

The 2009 game matched the No. 23 Utah Utes against the California Golden Bears; Utah won, 37–27.

The 2010 game matched the San Diego State Aztecs against the Navy Midshipmen. San Diego State won 35–14.  That year's attendance was 48,049.

Louisiana Tech and TCU received and accepted bids to participate in the 2011 game, which TCU won 31–24. TCU's participation was somewhat unexpected as they missed out on a third straight BCS Bowl by a single national rank position, ranked 17th in the nation. Had they been ranked No. 16 they would have automatically qualified for their third straight BCS Bowl appearance following their 21–19 victory over the Big Ten Conference champion Wisconsin Badgers in the 2011 Rose Bowl and their 17–10 loss to Boise State in the 2010 Fiesta Bowl.

On January 25, 2017, the San Diego Bowl Game Association announced plans to eliminate the Poinsettia Bowl and focus solely on the Holiday Bowl.

Game results

Military games

NCAA games

MVPs

Most appearances
Military games

NCAA games

Records by conference

See also
 List of college bowl games

References

Further reading

External links

 
 

 
Defunct college football bowls
American football in California
American football in San Diego
Military competitions in American football
2005 establishments in California
2017 disestablishments in California